The Chronicles of Town Called Jian is a 2018 Chinese television series based on the novel Tarot Goddess Sleuths by Zhang Ranran. The series was produced by Li Shaohong and directed by Zeng Nianping. It stars Victoria Song, Jiang Jinfu, Yang Yang and Zhang Zhixi.

The series began filming on December 13, 2013, and was concluded on March 6, 2014. The show first aired on January 1, 2018 via Mango TV.

Synopsis
Set during the Republican era, the story tells of Du Chunxiao; a smart young girl who uses her strange but unique ability to deduct clues and solve mysteries through the use of tarot cards. However, one day she decides to return to Jiangnan with her friend Huang Mengqing. As the Huang family accepts Chun Xiao as one of their own, Mr. Huang proposes the idea of marriage between his son Mo Ru, and Chun Xiao. Though she is not particularly attracted to Mo Ru, she continues to live with the Huang's until strange things begin to occur that endanger her life. It is during those difficult times, that she notices Huang Muyun, the youngest son of the Huang's. As the two discover their feelings for each other, secrets regarding Chun Xiao's true identity, as well as the darker nature of Mr. Huang's past deeds are unraveled.

Cast

Main

Supporting

Huang Manor

Others

Soundtrack

References

Chinese period television series
Chinese mystery television series
Hunan Television dramas
2018 Chinese television series debuts
Television shows based on Chinese novels
Chinese web series
2018 Chinese television series endings
2018 web series debuts
Mango TV original programming